Following is a list of current and former courthouses of the United States federal court system located in Vermont. Each entry indicates the name of the building along with an image, if available, its location and the jurisdiction it covers, the dates during which it was used for each such jurisdiction, and, if applicable the person for whom it was named, and the date of renaming. Dates of use will not necessarily correspond with the dates of construction or demolition of a building, as pre-existing structures may be adapted or court use, and former court buildings may later be put to other uses. Also, the official name of the building may be changed at some point after its use as a federal court building has been initiated.

Courthouses

Key

References

External links

U.S. Marshals Service District of Vermont Courthouse Locations

Vermont
 Federal courthouses
Courthouses, federal